The South American Under-20 Women's Futsal Championship (Spanish: Campeonato Sudamericano de Futsal Femenino Sub-20; Portuguese: Campeonato Sul-Americano de Futsal Feminino) is the U-20 version of Copa América Femenina de Futsal.

Results

Medal Count

References

External links
Sudamericano femenino sub 20 futsal Paraguay 2016

Futsal competitions in South America
CONMEBOL competitions for women's national teams
Women's international futsal competitions
South American youth sports competitions